Gareth Sparham is a scholar and translator in the field of Tibetan Buddhism.

Biography 

Born in Britain, Gareth Sparham lived as a Buddhist monk among the Tibetan exile community of Dharamsala, India, for twenty years, and studied through the Institute of Buddhist Dialectics from 1974 to 1982. Sparham earned his Ph.D. in 1989 from the University of British Columbia. He retired from his position as a lecturer in the Department of Asian Languages and Cultures of the University of Michigan in 2009.

Bibliography (translations)
The Tibetan Dhammapada. Wisdom Publications, 1986. A translation of the Udānavarga from the Tibetan.
Ocean of Eloquence: Tsong kha pa's Commentary on the Yogācāra Doctrine of Mind. SUNY Press, 1993.
The Fulfillment of All Hopes: Guru Devotion in Tibetan Buddhism. Wisdom Publications, 1999. Translation of a commentary by Tsongkhapa on Aśvaghoṣa's Gurupañcāśika.
Vast as the Heavens, Deep as the Sea: Verses in Praise of Bodhicitta. Wisdom Publications, 1999. A translation of Khunu Rinpoche Tenzin Gyaltsen's Jewel Lamp.
Tantric Ethics: An Explanation of the Precepts for Buddhist Vajrayāna Practice. Wisdom Publications, 2005. Translation of a work by Tsongkhapa.
Abhisamayālaṃkāra with Vṛtti and Āloka (in four volumes). Jain Publishing, 2006 (vol. 1) and 2008 (vol. 2). Translation of a Prajñāpāramitā commentary attributed to Maitreya, with two key subcommentaries by Ārya Vimuktisena and Haribhadra.
Golden Garland of Eloquence, vols. 1., 2., 3., 4. Jain Publishing. 2008. Translation of an Abhisamayālaṃkāra commentary by Tsongkhapa.

References

Living people
Gelug Buddhists
Tibetan Buddhism writers
Buddhist translators
Year of birth missing (living people)
University of Michigan faculty
Tibetan–English translators